The China–New Zealand relations, sometimes known as Sino–New Zealand relations, are the relations between China and New Zealand. New Zealand recognised the Republic of China after it lost the Chinese Civil War and retreated to Taiwan in 1949, but switched recognition to the People's Republic of China on 22 December 1972. Since then, economic, cultural, and political relations between the two countries have grown over the past four decades. China is New Zealand's largest trading partner in goods and second largest trading partner in services. In 2008, New Zealand became the first developed country to enter into a free trade agreement with China. In recent years, New Zealand's extensive economic relations with China has been complicated by its security ties to the United States.

In addition to formal diplomatic and economic relations, there has been significant people–to–people contact between China and New Zealand. Chinese immigration to New Zealand dates back to the gold rushes and has substantially increased since the 1980s.

History

Qing dynasty China
New Zealand's contact with China started in the mid 19th century. The first records of ethnic Chinese in New Zealand were migrant workers from Guangdong province, who arrived during the 1860s Otago Gold Rush. Most of the migrant workers were male, with few women migrants. Emigration from China was driven by overpopulation, land shortages, famine, drought, banditry, and peasant revolts, which triggered a wave of Chinese migration to Southeast Asia, Australia, New Zealand, the United States, and Canada.

Early Chinese migrants encountered considerable racial discrimination and prejudice. In 1871, the New Zealand Government imposed a poll tax on Chinese migrants that was not repealed until 1944. Other discriminatory policies included an English literacy test, restrictive immigration measures, denial of old age pensions, and being barred from permanent residency and citizenship (from 1908 to 1952). After the Gold Rush ended in the 1880s, many of the former Chinese miners found work as market gardeners, shopkeepers, and laundry operators. There was some limited intermarriage with White and indigenous Māori women.

Republic of China, 1912–1949
In 1903, the Qing dynasty had established a consulate in Wellington to deal with trade, immigration, and local Chinese welfare. Following the Xinhai Revolution in 1912, the Republic of China took over the consulate. The lack of a reciprocal New Zealand mission in China made the Republic of China's mission in Wellington serve as the primary point of contact between both governments until 1972. During the Republican era, New Zealand interests in China were largely represented by British diplomatic and consular missions. However, there were some attempts to establish New Zealand trade commissions in Tianjin and Shanghai.

Between 1912 and 1949, there were over 350 New Zealand expatriates living and working in China, including missionaries for various Christian denominations, medical workers, United Nations Relief and Rehabilitation Administration (UNRRA) workers, teachers, and telegraph workers. Some notable expatriates included the missionaries Annie James and James Huston Edgar, and the Communist writer, teacher, and activist Rewi Alley.

During the Second World War, New Zealand society developed a more favourable view of China because of its status as a wartime ally against Japan. Chinese market gardeners were viewed as an important contribution to the wartime economy. New Zealand also eased its immigration policy to admit Chinese refugees and grant them permanent residency. In the postwar years, many Chinese migrants, including women and children, settled in New Zealand since the Communist victory in 1949 made it difficult for many to return home.

Cold War tensions, 1949–1972
Following the establishment of the People's Republic of China (PRC) in 1949, New Zealand did not initially recognise the new government. Instead, it joined Australia and the United States in continuing to recognise the Republic of China (ROC) government, which had relocated to Taiwan, as the legitimate government of China. Between 1951 and 1960, New Zealand and Australia consistently supported a US moratorium proposal to block Soviet efforts to seat the PRC as the lawful representatives of China in the United Nations and to expel the ROC representatives. By contrast, the United Kingdom had established diplomatic relations with the PRC in 1949. While the conservative National Party favoured the ROC, the social
democratic Labour Party favoured extending diplomatic relations to the PRC. New Zealand and the PRC also fought on opposite sides during the Korean War, with the former supporting the United Nations forces and the latter backing North Korea.

The PRC government also expelled many missionaries and foreigners, including most New Zealand expatriates by 1951. One missionary, Annie James of the New Zealand Presbyterian Church's Canton Villages Mission, was imprisoned and interrogated. However, some pro-communist Westerners, including Rewi Alley, were allowed to remain in China. Alley pioneered a working model for secular "cooperative education" in vocational subjects and rural development. Despite the lack of official relations between the two countries, unofficial relations were conducted through the auspices of the Chinese People's Association for Friendship with Foreign Countries and the New Zealand China Friendship Society (NZCFS). In addition, the Communist Party of New Zealand and trade unions were sympathetic to the PRC.

In 1955 Warren Freer (then a Labour MP) was the first Western politician to visit China, against the wishes of Labour leader Walter Nash, but with the encouragement of Prime Minister Sidney Holland.

Prime Minister of New Zealand Keith Holyoake visited ROC President Chiang Kai-shek in 1960. Holyoake had a favourable view of the ROC and permitted the upgrading of the ROC consulate to full embassy status in 1962. However, New Zealand declined to establish any diplomatic or trading mission in Taiwan but opted to conduct its relations with the ROC through trade commissioners based in Tokyo and Hong Kong. As pressure for PRC representation at the United Nations grew, the New Zealand Government came to favour dual representation of both Chinese governments, but that was rejected by both the ROC and the PRC. In 1971, New Zealand and other US allies unsuccessfully opposed United Nations General Assembly Resolution 2758 to recognise the PRC as the "only legitimate representative of China to the UN."

People's Republic of China, 1971–present
In 1971 78 countries invited Chinese table tennis teams to tour, and New Zealand was the sixth nation's invitation accepted, for a tour in July 1972. The Chinese delegation arrived in Auckland, then flew to Wellington on Monday 17 July where they were met by protesters advising them to defect. They played in the Lower Hutt Town Hall. The following day an official afternoon tea reception was attended by the Prime Minister Jack Marshall, half the cabinet, Labour leader Norman Kirk, Wellington Mayor Frank Kitts, and Bryce Harland who was soon to be our first Ambassador to China. A tour followed, to the farm of former All Black Ken Gray at Pauatahanui;.where they watched sheep shearing and sheep dogs!      

In December 1972, the newly elected Third Labour Government formally recognised the People's Republic of China, with both governments signing a Joint Communique to govern bilateral relations. According to former New Zealand diplomat Gerald Hensley, Prime Minister Norman Kirk initially hesitated recognising the PRC until his second term but changed his mind because of the Ministry of Foreign Affairs. Kirk was influenced by his Australian counterpart Gough Whitlam's decision to recognise the PRC.

Despite ending diplomatic relations with the ROC, the New Zealand Permanent Representative to the UN negotiated an agreement with his ROC counterpart Huang Hua for both countries to continue maintaining trade and other non-official contacts with Taiwan. The last ROC Ambassador to New Zealand was Konsin Shah, the dean of the diplomatic corps in Wellington.

In April 1973, Joe Walding became the first New Zealand government minister to visit China and met Premier Zhou Enlai. In return, Chinese Foreign Trade Minister Bai Xiangguo visited Wellington, seeking to sign a trade agreement in New Zealand. The same year, the PRC established an embassy in Wellington, and Pei Tsien-chang was appointed as the first Chinese ambassador to New Zealand. In September 1973, the New Zealand Embassy was established in Beijing with Bryce Harland serving as the first New Zealand Ambassador to China.

Following the 1975 general election, the Third National Government abandoned National's support for the "Two Chinas policy" and expanded upon its Labour predecessors' diplomatic and trade relations with the PRC. In April–May 1976, Robert Muldoon became the first New Zealand Prime Minister to visit China. He visited Beijing and met with Premier Hua Guofeng and Chairman Mao Zedong. Muldoon's visit served to strengthen diplomatic and trading ties between the two countries and to reassure the New Zealand public that China did not pose a threat to New Zealand.

Since the end of the Cold War, bilateral relations between New Zealand and China have grown particularly in the areas of trade, education, tourism, climate change, and public sector co-operation. Bilateral relations has been characterized by trade and economic co-operation. In August 1997, New Zealand became the first Western country to support China's accession to the World Trade Organization by concluding a bilateral agreement. In April 2004, New Zealand became the first country to recognise China as a market economy during a second round of trade negotiations. In November 2004, New Zealand and China launched negotiations towards a free trade agreement in November 2004, with an agreement being signed in April 2008. In November 2016, both countries entered into negotiations to upgrade their free trade agreement.

Cultural relations

China and New Zealand have a long history of people–to–people contacts. During the 19th century, migrants migrated to New Zealand to work as miners. Despite racial prejudice and anti-immigrant legislation, a small number still settled down to work as market gardeners, businessmen, and shopkeepers. Following World War II, official and public attitudes and policies towards Chinese migrants were relaxed and more Chinese women and children were allowed to settle. During the post-war years, the Chinese population in New Zealand increased with many becoming middle-class professionals and businessmen.

In 1987, the New Zealand Government abandoned its long-standing preference for British and Irish immigrants in favour for a skills-based immigration policy. By 2013, the Chinese New Zealander population had increased to 171,411, comprising 4% of the country's population. Within this group, three-quarters were foreign-born and only one-quarter were locally-born. Of the foreign-born population, 51% came from China, 5% from Taiwan, and 4% from Hong Kong.

In addition, several New Zealand missionaries, businessmen, aid workers, and telegraph workers have lived and worked in China as long-term residents. One notable New Zealand expatriate in China was Rewi Alley, a New Zealand-born writer, educator, social reformer, potter, and member of the Chinese Communist Party (CCP). He lived and worked in China for 60 years until his death in 1987. He came to symbolise the important role of people to people contacts in building good relations and accentuating common ground between countries as different as New Zealand and China. In 1997, the 100th anniversary of Alley's birth was marked by celebrations in Beijing and New Zealand.

Economic relations

Trade

In 1972, New Zealand's trade relations with Mainland China were paltry with NZ exports to China estimated to being less than NZ$2 million per annum. Early New Zealand exports to China included timber, pulp and paper while early Chinese exports to NZ were high-quality printing paper and chemicals. Over the successive decades, trade between the two countries grew. In terms of the Chinese share of New Zealand trade, New Zealand's exports to China rose from about 2% in 1981 to about 4.9% in 1988. In 1990, it dropped to 1% due to the fallout from the Tiananmen Square massacre. By 2001, NZ exports to China accounted for 7% of China's New Zealand's overseas trade. Meanwhile, New Zealand imports to China rose from below 1% of New Zealand's trade volume in 1981 to 7% by 2001.

Mainland China (i.e. excluding Hong Kong and Macau) is New Zealand's largest trading partner, with bilateral trade between the two countries in 2017-18 valued at NZ$27.75 billion. Hong Kong SAR is New Zealand's 13th-largest trading partner, with bilateral trade of NZ$2.1 billion.

New Zealand's main exports to China are dairy products, travel and tourism, wood and wood products, meat, fish and seafood, and fruit. China's main exports to New Zealand are electronics, machinery, textiles, furniture, and plastics.

Free trade agreement

A free trade agreement (FTA) between China and New Zealand was signed on 7 April 2008 by Premier of the People's Republic of China Wen Jiabao and Prime Minister of New Zealand Helen Clark in Beijing. Under the agreement, about one third of New Zealand exports to China will be free of tariffs from 1 October 2008, with another third becoming tariff free by 2013, and all but 4% by 2019. In return, 60% of China's exports to New Zealand will become tariff free by 2016 or earlier; more than a third are already duty-free. Investment, migration, and trade in services will also be facilitated.

The free trade agreement with China is New Zealand's most significant since the Closer Economic Relations agreement with Australia was signed in 1983. It was also the first time China has entered into a comprehensive free trade agreement with a developed country.

The agreement took more than three years to negotiate. On 19 November 2004 Helen Clark and President of the People's Republic of China, Hu Jintao announced the commencement of negotiations towards an FTA at the APEC Leaders meeting in Santiago, Chile. The first round of negotiations was held in December 2004. Fifteen rounds took place before the FTA was signed in April 2008.

While the FTA enjoys the support of New Zealand's two largest political parties, Labour and National, other parties such as the Green Party and the Māori Party opposed the agreement at the time.  Winston Peters was also a vocal opponent of the agreement, but agreed not to criticise it while acting as Minister of Foreign Affairs overseas (a position he held from 2005 to 2008).

In early November 2019, New Zealand and China agreed to upgrade their free trade agreement. China has eased restrictions on New Zealand exports and given New Zealand preferential access to the wood and paper trade with China. In return, New Zealand agree to lessen visa restrictions for Chinese tour guides and Chinese language teachers.

On 26 January 2021, New Zealand and China signed a deal to upgrade their free trade agreement to give New Zealand exports greater access to the Chinese market, eliminating or reducing tariffs on New Zealand exports such as dairy, timber, and seafood as well as compliance costs.

Film cooperation
In May 2015, The Hollywood Reporter reported that several Chinese, New Zealand, and Canadian film companies including the China Film Group, the Qi Tai Culture Development Group, New Zealand's Huhu Studios, and the Canadian Stratagem Entertainment had entered into a US$800 million agreement to produce 17 live-action and animated films over the next six to eight years. As part of the agreement, the China Film Group's animation division China Film Animation would be working with Huhu Studios to produce an animated film called Beast of Burden with a US$20 million budget. This partnership between Huhu Studios and China Film Animation was the first official New Zealand–Chinese film co-production agreement. The film was subsequently released as Mosley on 10 October 2019.

Education relations
China and New Zealand have a history of education links and exchanges, including bilateral scholarship programmes and academic cooperation. There was a dramatic expansion in student flows and other engagement in the late 1990s. During the 1990s, the number of Chinese nationals studying at public tertiary institutions in New Zealand rose from 49 in 1994, 89 in 1998, 457 in 1999, 1,696 in 2000, 5,236 in 2001, and 11,700 in 2002. The percentage of full fee paying Asian students from China at public tertiary institutions also rose from 1.5% in 1994 to 56.3% by 2002. The increase in Chinese international students in New Zealand accompanied the increase in the percentage of international students at New Zealand universities and polytechnics.

Between 2003 and 2011, the number of Chinese students studying in New Zealand dropped from 56,000 to about 30,000 by 2011. In 2003, Chinese students accounted for 46% of all international students in New Zealand. By 2011, this figure had dropped to 25%. As of 2017, China was the largest source of international students in New Zealand. In 2017, there were over 40,000 Chinese student enrollments in New Zealand.

In 2019 Chinese Vice Consul General Xiao Yewen intervened at Auckland University of Technology in relation to an event marking the 30th Anniversary of the Tiananmen Square massacre. AUT cancelled the booking for the event and it went ahead at a council-owned facility.

Diplomatic relations

People's Republic of China
New Zealand is represented in China through the New Zealand Embassy in Beijing, with consulates in Shanghai, Guangzhou, Hong Kong and Chengdu. The Chengdu Consulate-General was opened by the New Zealand Prime Minister the Rt Hon John Key in November 2014. China is represented in New Zealand through the Embassy of the People's Republic of China in Wellington, with consulates in Auckland and Christchurch.

Hong Kong
In addition to its diplomatic relations with mainland of China, New Zealand also maintains diplomatic and economic relations with the Hong Kong Special Administrative Region. In March 2010, New Zealand and Hong Kong entered into a bilateral economic partnership agreement. New Zealand maintains a Consulate-General in Hong Kong, which is also accredited to the Macau SAR. Hong Kong's interests in New Zealand are represented by the Chinese Embassy in Wellington and the Hong Kong Economic and Trade Office in Sydney.

Republic of China (Taiwan) 
Though New Zealand no longer has diplomatic relations with Taiwan, New Zealand still maintains trade, economic, and cultural relations with Taiwan. Taiwan has two Economic and Cultural offices in Auckland and Wellington. New Zealand also has a Commerce and Industry Office in Taipei.

State visits

Chinese tours by New Zealand delegates and ministers

New Zealand Ministerial Visits to the People's Republic of China:

New Zealand tours by Chinese delegates and ministers

Chinese Ministerial Visits to New Zealand

President

Premier

State Council

Ministers

Controversies and disputes
China–New Zealand relations has not been without discord. The crackdown by the Chinese Government on the Tiananmen Square demonstrations of June 1989 was strongly condemned in New Zealand and official ministerial contact was suspended for more than a year. Other disagreements between Wellington and Beijing have included the suppression of political liberties, Chinese militarisation, the sale of weapons and nuclear technology to Middle Eastern countries, Chinese nuclear testing, and Chinese policies towards Taiwan, Tibet, and the Uyghur Muslim minority in China's Xinjiang province.

"Magic Weapons" allegations
In September 2017, the University of Canterbury political scientist and China expert Dr Anne-Marie Brady presented a conference paper entitled "Magic Weapons: China's political influence activities under Xi Jinping" alleging that the Chinese Government was using local Chinese community organisations and ethnic media as part of a "united front" strategy and the One Belt One Road initiative to advance Chinese soft power influence in New Zealand. Alleged Chinese activities have included using "united front" organizations to promote support for Beijing among the Chinese New Zealand community, monitoring Chinese students academics, cultivating relations with New Zealand's political and business elites, and encouraging Chinese diaspora participation in New Zealand politics. Key "united front" organizations have included the New Zealand China Friendship Society, Peaceful Reunification of China Association of New Zealand (PRCANZ), the New Zealand Overseas Chinese Service Centre, and local branches of the Chinese Students and Scholars Association.

According to Brady's research, Chinese state agencies like the Xinhua News Agency had forged cooperation agreements with several NZ Chinese media outlets including the Chinese Herald, FM 90.6, Panda TV, Channel 37, Chinese Times, Kiwi Style, SkyKiwi, World TV, and NCTV, bringing them in line with Beijing's agenda. Brady also raised concerns about Chinese united front efforts to cultivate the support of politicians from the New Zealand National, Labour, and ACT parties including National Member of Parliament Jian Yang, Labour candidate Raymond Huo, and ACT candidate Kenneth Wang. Brady's paper suggested that Yang had once been a Chinese intelligence officer since he had taught at the People's Liberation Army's Air Force Engineering University and Luoyang PLA University of Foreign Language. In addition, Brady's paper noted that several former National MPs and ministers including Ruth Richardson, Chris Tremain, Don Brash, and former Prime Minister Jenny Shipley had joined the boards of several Chinese banks.

Brady's paper coincided with the 2017 New Zealand general election and attracted substantial attention from New Zealand politicians, commentators and the media. The-then Prime Minister Bill English said he had no concerns about the issues raised by the report while Labour leader Jacinda Ardern said that she did not see a need to follow Australia's lead in scrutinizing Chinese influence in domestic affairs but vowed to look at the issue further. Don Brash, who was named in the report for his co-directorship of the Industrial Bank of China in New Zealand, stated that China was no different than other great powers in wanting to extend its influence and cultivate allies. Huo, who was named in the report, stated "that there was a fine line between what Brady has alleged and the genuine promotion of the NZ-China relationship." Former Prime Minister Helen Clark responded that New Zealand should engage with major powers in the Asia-Pacific region but "should not be naive in its interaction with them." Shipley denied being a "mouthpiece" of the Chinese Government.

Huawei 5G ban

In late November 2018, the New Zealand Government banned the Chinese telecommunications company Huawei from supplying mobile equipment to national telecommunications company Spark New Zealand's 5G network. This was done at the advice of NZ's signals intelligence agency, the Government Communications Security Bureau, which cited a "significant network security risk." The New Zealand ban has been linked to similar efforts by other Western governments including the United States, the United Kingdom, and Australia to restrict the usage of Huawei products and services in their 5G networks as well as the ongoing China-United States trade war. GCSB Minister Andrew Little has defended the ban citing China's National Intelligence Law which compels Chinese corporates and citizens to co-operate and collaborate with Chinese intelligence.

Huawei New Zealand managing director Yanek Fan has criticized the New Zealand Government for treating the company unfairly while telecommunications provider 2degrees has criticized the ban for harming competition. Chinese Foreign Ministry spokesperson Geng Shuan has called on New Zealand to provide a level playing field for Chinese companies. Meanwhile, the CCP-owned tabloid Global Times has warned that the Huawei ban would hurt New Zealand's industry and consumers.

In early 2019, various New Zealand media have speculated that the Chinese cancellation of the 2019 New Zealand-China Year of Tourism event at Te Papa Museum in Wellington and the decision to deny an Air New Zealand flight landing rights were connected to the Huawei ban. Air New Zealand Flight NZ289 had initially been denied landing rights due to references in the flight plan to Taiwan as an independent state; something at odds with the One China Policy. In response to media reportage, Prime Minister Jacinda Ardern has publicly denied that there has been a breakdown in China-New Zealand relations and stated that the denial of the Air New Zealand flight landing rights was the result of administrative errors. Opposition Leader Simon Bridges has criticized the Labour-led coalition government for allegedly damaging China-New Zealand relations. According to clarification posts in Weibo, the plane was never registered in the CCAR part 125 required by Civil Aviation Administration of China, and landing without that registration will result in loss of points, affecting their operations in China. The particular plane registered as ZK-NZQ has a cabin configuration is not usually used to operate flights to mainland China, and in its 5 months of service have never been to mainland China before.

During a press conference held in mid-February 2019, Chinese Foreign Ministry Spokesperson Geng Shuang denied that there was a breakdown in bilateral relations in response to the cancellation of the 2019 China-New Zealand Year of Tourism event and Chinese media reports discouraging Chinese tourists from visiting New Zealand. He clarified that the Chinese Embassy and consulate generals in New Zealand had issued statements advising their nationals to take precautions against theft and robbery while visiting New Zealand. Shuang characterized the Chinese-New Zealand relationship as "sound and steady."

In mid July 2020, GCSB Minister Little confirmed that New Zealand would not ban Huawei equipment in response to similar decisions by the British and United States governments to exclude Huawei from their 5G networks on national security grounds. Telecommunications Users Association chief executive Craig Young welcomed the Government's announcement, saying that a ban would force companies with Huawei equipment to replace expensive equipment due to the integrated nature of the country's 2G, 3G and 4G networks. In response to the Government's announcement, Huawei NZ's deputy managing director Andrew Bowater emphasized the company's commitment to helping customers deal with the effects of the COVID-19 pandemic in New Zealand.

China's Xinjiang policies
In July 2019, the UN ambassadors from 22 nations, including New Zealand, signed a joint letter to the UNHRC condemning China's mistreatment of the Uyghurs as well as its mistreatment of other minority groups, urging the Chinese government to close the Xinjiang re-education camps.

On 20 July, Prime Minister Jacinda Ardern criticised China's treatment of Uyghurs, the new Hong Kong national security law, and Chinese opposition to Taiwanese membership of the World Health Organization while addressing the China Business Summit in Auckland. In response, Chinese Ambassador Wu Xi warned New Zealand not to interfere in Chinese internal affairs, stating that "we should not take our relationship for granted and... should make sure that our bilateral relations are immune from various virus in these trying times."

In late April 2021, the libertarian ACT party sponsored motion asking the New Zealand Parliament to debate and vote on whether China's alleged oppression of the Uyghur minority constituted a genocide. This motion was supported by the Green Party and the Māori Party. In response, Minister of Trade Damien O'Connor warned that the Uyghur genocide motion could have significant repercussions for China-New Zealand relations. The Chinese Ambassador Wu Xi also issued a statement warning against foreign interference and dismissed talk of forced labour and genocide as "lies" fabricated by anti-China elements.

On 4 May, the ruling Labour Party successfully revised the motion to discuss concerns about human rights abuses in Xinjiang while omitting the term genocide. On 5 May, the New Zealand Parliament unanimously accepted a motion stating that "severe human rights abuses" were happening in Xinjiang and called on the Government "to work with all relevant instruments of international law to bring these abuses to an end." On 5 May, the Chinese Embassy issued a statement claiming that the motion was based on a "groundless accusation on China over human rights abuse" and interfered in Chinese internal affairs.

2019 Hong Kong protests
In early August 2019, the New Zealand government rebuked Chinese diplomats over recent comments and actions in which they sought to suppress freedom of speech and voiced support for violent opposition to Hong Kong protestors in New Zealand. Earlier, the Chinese Consulate-General in Auckland had praised the "patriotic actions" of Chinese students who had confronted a group of pro-Hong Kong democracy student activists at the University of Auckland. The Hong Kong student activists had set up a Lennon Wall to express solidarity with the 2019–20 Hong Kong protests. One of the Chinese students had reportedly assaulted a Hong Kong student during an altercation at the university in late July 2019.
Ministry of Foreign Affairs and Trade officials cautioned Chinese officials about their interference in New Zealand affairs, and Prime Minister Ardern reiterated New Zealand's commitment to free speech on university campuses. ACT Party leader David Seymour also sent a letter to the Consulate-General criticizing it for interfering in New Zealand internal affairs.

In response, Chinese Foreign Ministry spokesperson Hua Chunying defended the actions of Chinese international students and the Consulate-General in Auckland, blaming "Hong Kong independence" activists for stirring up anti-China sentiments at the University of Auckland. While sympathising with the patriotic feelings of Chinese students, Hua reminded Chinese students to abide by New Zealand law and the regulations of their university. Hua also defended the actions of the Consulate-General as "fulfilling its duty" and "beyond reproach." She also called on certain New Zealanders to stop condoning "anti-China separatist activities" under the guise of free speech. Hua also defended the response of the Chinese Consulate-General in Brisbane following similar clashes between pro-Hong Kong and pro-China students at the University of Queensland.

Taiwan's bid to join the World Health Organization
In early May 2020, Foreign Minister Winston Peters expressed support for Taiwan rejoining the World Health Organization during a press conference. Taiwan has been excluded from the international organisation due to the One China Policy. The Taiwanese Government welcomed Peter's remarks while the Chinese Embassy objected to Peters' remarks, reiterating that New Zealand should abide by the One China Policy. The New Zealand Government has since backed Taiwan's bid to join the WHO, placing NZ alongside Australia and the United States who have taken similar positions during the COVID-19 pandemic.

On 12 May, Chinese Foreign Ministry spokesperson Zhao Lijian responded by warning that Peters' remarks violated the One China Policy and would hurt bilateral relations during the two countries. He claimed that Beijing had made proper arrangements for Taiwan's participation in global health events and accused Taipei of exploiting the COVID-19 pandemic to seek Taiwanese independence. Peters has stood by his earlier remarks.

Hong Kong national security law, 2020
On 9 July, Foreign Minister Winston Peters announced that New Zealand would review "the setting of its relationship" with Hong Kong in response to the introduction of the Hong Kong national security law earlier that month. On 28 July, New Zealand suspended its extradition treaty with Hong Kong, with Foreign Minister Peters stating that the new law "eroded rule-of-law principles" and undermined the "one country, two systems" rule. Prime Minister Ardern also criticised the new law for violating New Zealand's principles of freedom of association and the right to take a political view. In response, the Chinese Embassy criticised the New Zealand Government for violating international law and norms, and interfering in China's internal affairs. On 3 August, China suspended its extradition agreement with New Zealand in retaliation to NZ's suspension of its extradition agreement with Hong Kong. In response, Foreign Minister Peters' office countered that New Zealand lacked an extradition agreement with China.

On 6 October, New Zealand joined a group of 39 mainly US–aligned countries alongside Albania, Bosnia-Herzegovina, Canada, Haiti Honduras, and Japan in issuing a joint statement at the United Nations to denounce China for its treatment of ethnic minorities and for curtailing freedoms in Hong Kong.

On 18 November, the New Zealand Foreign Minister Nanaia Mahuta joined her Australian, Canadian, British and United States counterparts in issuing a joint statement  condemning the disqualification of pro-democracy legislators as a breach of Hong Kong's autonomy and rights under the framework of the Sino-British Joint Declaration. In response, the Chinese Foreign Ministry's spokesperson Zhao Lijian issued a warning to the Five Eyes countries, stating that "No matter if they have five eyes or 10 eyes, if they dare to harm China's sovereignty, security and development interests, they should beware of their eyes being poked and blinded." In response, Mahuta defended New Zealand's commitment to free speech, free media, and democracy.

Brereton Report
On 1 December 2020, Prime Minister Ardern expressed concern about a doctored Chinese Foreign Ministry official Zhao Lijian's Twitter post showing an Australian soldier holding a bloodied knife against the throat of an Afghan child, describing the post as "un-factual."  Foreign Minister Nanaia Mahuta had also described the tweet as "inflammatory disinformation"  and conveyed New Zealand's concerns to Beijing. The Australian Government had earlier condemned the tweet as "offensive" and "outrageous" and demanded an apology from Beijing. The Chinese post had occurred against the backdrop of  the Brereton Report and recent tensions in Australia–China relations. In response, Chinese Foreign Ministry spokesperson Hua Chunying expressed surprise at New Zealand's concern and defended the accuracy of the picture and posts.

Disagreements with Five Eyes partners
In mid-April 2021, Foreign Minister Nanaia Mahuta stated that New Zealand would not let the United States–led Five Eyes alliance dictate its bilateral relationship with China and that New Zealand was uncomfortable with expanding the remit of the intelligence grouping. In that statement Mahuta also described the relationship between New Zealand and China as the relationship between a taniwha and a dragon. Mahuta's statements came amidst rising disagreements between Wellington and Canberra on how to manage relations with Beijing. The Australian Government has expressed concern about the New Zealand Government's perceived efforts to  undermine collective attempts to push back against what it regards as "increasingly aggressive behaviour from Beijing."

In response to Mahuta's remarks, Prime Minister Ardern claimed that New Zealand was still committed to the Five Eyes alliance but would not use the group as its first point for messaging on non-security matters. While The Telegraph defence editor Con Coughlin criticised New Zealand for undermining the Five Eyes' efforts to put a united front against Beijing, the Global Times praised New Zealand for putting its own national interests over the Five Eyes.

Chinese cyber attacks

On 20 July 2021, the Minister in charge of the Government Communications Security Bureau Andrew Little confirmed that the spy agency had established links between Chinese state-sponsored actors known as "Advanced Persistent Threat 40" (APT40) and malicious cyber activity in New Zealand. In addition, Little confirmed that New Zealand was joining other Western governments including the United States, United Kingdom, Australia and the European Union in condemning the Chinese Ministry of State Security and other Chinese state-sponsored actors for their involvement in the 2021 Microsoft Exchange Server data breach. In response, the Chinese Embassy in New Zealand rejected these allegations and lodged a "solemn representation" with the New Zealand Government.

On 21 July, Foreign Minister Nanaia Mahuta confirmed that New Zealand Foreign Ministry officials had met with Chinese Embassy officials at the request of the Chinese Embassy in response to the cyber attack allegations. The Embassy urged the New Zealand Government to abandon its so-called "Cold War mentality." New Zealand exporters have expressed concerns that an escalation of diplomatic tensions could have serious implications for China-New Zealand trade.

2021 Hong Kong legislative election
Following the 2021 Hong Kong legislative election held in December 2021, Foreign Minister Mahuta joined New Zealand's Five Eyes partners in issuing a joint statement criticising the exclusion of opposition candidates and urging China to respect human rights and freedoms in Hong Kong in accordance with the Sino-British Joint Declaration. In response, the Chinese Embassy in Wellington issued a statement claiming the elections were "politically inclusive and fair" and urging the Five Eyes alliance to respect Chinese sovereignty over Hong Kong.

2022 Sino-Solomon Islands defence pact

In late March 2022, Prime Minister Ardern and Foreign Minister Mahuta joined the Australian Government in voicing concerns about a proposed Solomon Islands security agreement with China. This agreement would allow China to deploy military and security forces in the Solomon Islands and to establish a military base.

See also

China-New Zealand Free Trade Agreement
Sino-Pacific relations
Foreign relations of China
Foreign relations of New Zealand
Chinese New Zealanders

References

Further reading

External links
New Zealand - China Free Trade Agreement, New Zealand Ministry of Foreign Affairs and Trade

 
New Zealand
Bilateral relations of New Zealand